The Resale Prices Act 1964 c. 53 was a  consolidation Act which when passed, now considered all resale price agreements to be against public interest unless proven otherwise.

Minimum resale price maintenance (MRPM) had ensured that retailers could only sell a product at a price determined by the manufacturer. The abolition of MRPM allowed such retailers to expand; for Instance Comet Group transformed from a small electrical retail chain in Yorkshire to a national discount retailer.

The Resale Prices Act 1976 was repealed on 1 March 2000; UK Competition law having been previously incorporated into the Competition Act 1998.

References

United Kingdom Acts of Parliament 1964
United Kingdom Acts of Parliament 1976
Repealed United Kingdom Acts of Parliament